William Stitt Peters (May 1867 – April 2, 1933) was an American baseball, player, manager, and owner who played in predecessor teams to the Negro leagues. Peters played first base and managed the Chicago Unions from 1887 to 1900.  After owner Frank Leland moved many of the team's players to the Chicago Union Giants, Peters formed his owned team, the Peters Union Giants. He ran the club until 1923.

In 1917, he is listed to have attended the annual Chicago Baseball League meeting with fellow team managers Jimmy Keown and Louis Gertenrich. Peters was the father of fellow Negro leaguer Frank Peters.

References

External links
 and Seamheads

1867 births
1933 deaths
People from Kentucky
Baseball executives
Chicago Unions players
Negro league baseball managers
Negro league baseball executives
African-American baseball players
20th-century African-American people